The Kwara'ae language (previously called Fiu after the location of many of its speakers) is spoken in the north of Malaita Island in the Solomon Islands. In 1999, there were 32,400 people known to speak the language. It is the largest indigenous vernacular of the Solomon Islands.

Phonology 

The /f/ sound is merged with /h/. Most speakers of Kwara'ae choose to pronounce /h/ as an /f/ sound in some vocabulary.

The sound [ə] is recognized as an allophone of /a/. There is vowel reduction, so final /i/ and /u/ are often deleted. Before /i/, the vowel /a/ may become [e], forming the diphthong [ei].

References

External links
Anglican liturgical publications in Kwara'ae from Project Canterbury

Malaita languages
Languages of the Solomon Islands